The 36th Filmfare Awards South ceremony honoring the winners of the best of South Indian cinema in 1988 was an event held on 13 August 1989. The president of this year's function was Dr. M. Tamilkudimagan, Speaker of the Tamil Nadu Legislative assembly. The chief guest of the evening was Dev Anand.

Awards

Kannada cinema

Malayalam cinema

Tamil cinema

Telugu cinema

Special Awards

Awards Presentation

 V. Verghese (Best Film Kannada) Received Award from D. Ramanaidu
 I. V. Sasi Receives Mohammed Mannil Award (Best Film Malayalam) from L. V. Prasad
 Appa Rao Ch V. (Best Film Telugu) Received Award from S. Balachander
 G. Venkateswaran (Best Film Tamil) Received Award from Dev Anand
 Suresh Babu Receives Dinesh Babu Award (Best Director Kannada) from Girija
 Padmarajan (Best Director Malayalam) Received Award from Swapna
 Balu Mahendra (Best Director Tamil) Received Award from Bharathi Raja
 Suhasini (Best Actress Kannada) Received Award from Sivakumar
 Revathi (Best Actress Malayalam) Received Award from Mani Rathnam
 Bhanupriya (Best Actress Telugu) Received Award from Sathyaraj
 Archana (Best Actress Tamil) Received Award from Sowcar Janaki
 Vishnuvardhan (Best Actor Telugu) Received Award from K. Vishwanath
 Venkatesh (Best Actor Telugu) Received Award from K. Balaji
 Karthik (Best Actor Tamil) Received Award from Boney Kapoor
 Bhanumathi Ramakrishna (For Outstanding Contribution to Indian Films) Received Award from M. Tamilkudimagan

References

 Filmfare Magazine September 1989.

General

External links
 
 

Filmfare Awards South